John Griffin Carlisle (September 5, 1834July 31, 1910) was an American politician from the commonwealth of Kentucky and was a member of the Democratic Party. He was elected to the United States House of Representatives seven times, first in 1876, and served as Speaker of the House, from 1883 to 1889. He subsequently served as a U.S. senator from Kentucky, from 1890 to 1893, and then as Secretary of the Treasury, from 1893 to 1897, during the Panic of 1893. As a Bourbon Democrat he was a leader of the conservative, pro-business wing of the party, along with President Grover Cleveland.

Biography

Carlisle was born in what is now Kenton County, Kentucky. He was well educated and took a post as a teacher in Covington, Kentucky. His father died in 1853 and he was left to support his family. He studied law under John W. Stevenson, and joined the law firm of William Kinkeard in Covington at the age of 23. Carlisle married Mary Jane Goodson on January 15, 1857, and they had five children, all of whom predeceased them.

Despite the political difficulties that taking a neutral position during the American Civil War caused him, Carlisle spent most of the 1860s in the Kentucky General Assembly, serving in the Kentucky House of Representatives and two terms in the Kentucky State Senate, and was elected Lieutenant Governor of Kentucky in 1871, succeeding his former law mentor Stevenson.

After Carlisle's term as Lieutenant governor ended in 1875, he ran for and won a seat in the United States House of Representatives for Kentucky's 6th district. On the main issues of the day, Carlisle was in favor of coining silver, but not for free coinage, and favored lower tariffs. He became a leader of the low-tariff wing of the Democratic Party, and was chosen by House Democrats to become Speaker in 1883 over Samuel J. Randall, a leader of the party's protectionist wing.

Carlisle became a leader of the conservative Bourbon Democrats and was mentioned as a presidential candidate but the Democrats passed him over at their conventions for Winfield S. Hancock in 1880 and Grover Cleveland in 1884. Discomfort with nominating a southerner after the Civil War played a role in Carlisle's failure to win either nomination. In 1892 Carlisle was again proposed as a candidate for president at the Democratic convention, but this time Carlisle asked that he not be considered. It was reported at the time that Carlisle dropped out with the understanding that Cleveland, once nominated, would appoint him to his Cabinet.

In 1890, Carlisle was appointed to the United States Senate to fill the unexpired term of James B. Beck. When Cleveland was again elected to the Presidency in 1892, he chose Carlisle as his Secretary of the Treasury.

Carlisle's tenure as Secretary was marred by the Panic of 1893, a financial and economic disaster so severe that it ended Carlisle's political career. In response to a run on the American gold supply, Carlisle felt forced to end silver coinage. He also felt compelled to oppose the 1894 Wilson–Gorman Tariff bill. These two stands were widely unpopular among agrarian Democrats. In 1896 Carlisle strenuously opposed Democratic presidential nominee William Jennings Bryan, supporting a splinter Gold Democrat candidate, once-Illinois Governor Palmer, instead.

By 1896, the once remarkably popular Carlisle was so disliked due to his stewardship of the currency that he was forced to leave the stage in the middle of a speech in his home town of Covington due to a barrage of abuse. Feeling rejected, he retired from public life and sold his house in Covington.

By May 1899, the North American Trust Company had directors such as John G. Carlisle, Adlai E. Stevenson, and Wager Swayne.

He moved to New York City, where he practiced law, and died on July 31, 1910, at age 75, and is buried in Linden Grove Cemetery in Covington, Kentucky.

Legacy
Carlisle County, Kentucky was established in 1886.

References

Sources

 Barnes, James A. John G. Carlisle: Financial Statesman. New York : Dodd, Mead, 1931.
 Beito, David T., and Linda Royster Beito. Gold Democrats and the Decline of Classical Liberalism from 1896 to 1900, Independent Review 4 (Spring 2000), 555–75.

 Garraty, John A. and Mark C. Carnes. American National Biography, vol. 4, "Carlisle, John G.". New York : Oxford University Press, 1999.

 Williams, R. Hal. Years of Decision: American Politics in the 1890s. New York : Wiley, 1978.

External links

 John G. Carlisle at Linden Grove Cemetery
 

|-

|-

|-

|-

|-

1834 births
1910 deaths
19th-century American politicians
Bourbon Democrats
Speakers of the United States House of Representatives
United States Secretaries of the Treasury
Democratic Party United States senators from Kentucky
Lieutenant Governors of Kentucky
Members of the Kentucky House of Representatives
Kentucky state senators
Politicians from Covington, Kentucky
Cleveland administration cabinet members
Democratic Party members of the United States House of Representatives from Kentucky
North American Trust Company people
People from Kenton County, Kentucky